Adam William Morgan (born 28 October 1988) is a British auto racing driver. He currently drives in the British Touring Car Championship.

Career

Early years
Born in Blackburn, Morgan began his career in Cadet Karts from age 8–11 (1996–99), then moved on to higher classes such as Junior TKM and Junior Max. He remained in Karts until 2004.

In 2006, Morgan competed in the National Historic Rally Championship in a Ford Escort Mk1 Mexico. He won 4 out of 7 rallies entered and finished the season second in class.

Morgan made his racing debut in 2008, competing in the Ma5da Championship and two rounds of the Ginetta G20 Cup, where he achieved his first race win at Pembrey.

For 2009, Morgan began racing in the Ginetta G50 Cup for the last two rounds, with a best finish of fourth. He remained in the championship for 2010, finishing in sixth place overall.

Morgan proceeded to race with family run Ciceley Racing during the 2011 season, and won the inaugural Ginetta GT Supercup and with it a fully funded British Touring Car drive.

British Touring Car Championship

Speedworks Motorsport (2012)
He was the 2011 Ginetta GT Supercup champion, for winning the championship he received a fully funded drive in the 2012 British Touring Car Championship with Speedworks Motorsport paid for by Ginetta. Morgan matched the pace of test driver James Thompson in his first winter test session. He did not finish any of the races in his first meeting at Brands Hatch, he crashed out of the first race and was unable to start the second race. He was caught up in a multi car pileup in race three after oil was deposited on the track by Mat Jackson's car. He started on pole position for the reversed grid third race at Rockingham but lost the lead on the opening lap in the wet conditions, he went on to finish 11th. He took a best finish of 8th in the penultimate round of the season at Silverstone and he finished the season 19th in the drivers' standings.

Ciceley Racing (2013–)

In November 2012, Morgan announced he would be leaving Speedworks Motorsport and would be driving for his family run Ciceley Racing team in 2013, racing an ex-Dynojet Racing Toyota Avensis.

In September 2013, Ciceley Racing announced it would build an NGTC Mercedes A-Class for the 2014 British Touring Car Championship season.

Britcar

In 2018, Morgan raced in the Dunlop Endurance Championship with former-BTCC driver Stewart Lines in a Class 4E (Endurance) SEAT Cupra TCR run by Maximum Motorsport. They positioned 10th on the grid in race one at Rockingham, 2nd in Class 4E. They finished 14th in race one, 2nd in class and had the fastest lap in Class 2E. In the Endurance race 2, Lines and Morgan finished in 5th, 2nd in Class 4E, and set the fastest lap again. In round two at Silverstone, the SEAT placed 16th on the grid for race one, 2nd in Class 4E again. In race one, they finished 13th, 2nd in Class 4E. In the Endurance race at Silverstone, the SEAT duo finished 3rd in the race, 1st in Class 4E for the first time, setting the fastest lap once again.

Racing record

Complete British Touring Car Championship results
(key) (Races in bold indicate pole position – 1 point awarded in first race; races in italics indicate fastest lap – 1 point awarded all races; * signifies that driver lead race for at least one lap – 1 point given)

Complete Britcar results
(key) (Races in bold indicate pole position in class – 1 point awarded just in first race; races in italics indicate fastest lap in class – 1 point awarded all races;-

Complete British GT Championship results
(key) (Races in bold indicate pole position) (Races in italics indicate fastest lap)

Complete TCR UK/Touring Car Trophy results
(key) (Races in bold indicate pole position – 1 point awarded just in first race; races in italics indicate fastest lap – 1 point awarded all races; * signifies that driver led race for at least one lap – 1 point given all races)

References

External links
 Official website of Adam Morgan Racing BTCC Driver
 Speedworks Motorsport

1988 births
Living people
Sportspeople from Blackburn
British Touring Car Championship drivers
English racing drivers
Britcar drivers
24H Series drivers
Ginetta GT4 Supercup drivers